Richard Neilson (1 April 1916 – 14 December 2005) was an English professional footballer who played as a  centre half for Manchester City and was later a manager for Droylsden.

References 

1916 births
2005 deaths
Droylsden F.C. managers
Manchester City F.C. players
English footballers
Association football central defenders
English football managers